Telipna atrinervis is a butterfly in the family Lycaenidae. It is found in Cameroon, Equatorial Guinea, the Republic of the Congo, Gabon and the Central African Republic.

References

Butterflies described in 1924
Poritiinae